Long Khánh is a city of Đồng Nai Province in the Southeast region of Vietnam. It covers an area of  194 km² and had a population of 171,276 in 2019.

Long Khánh city's predecessor was Long Khánh town, which founded in 2003. It was recognized as a city in 2019.

Geography
Long Khánh is located entirely in Đồng Nai territory. It shares borders with:
Xuân Lộc district to the east
Thống Nhất district to the west
Cẩm Mỹ district to the south
Xuân Lộc district, Thống Nhất district and Định Quán district to the North

Long Khánh has 15 divisions (11 wards and 4 commune), include: 

Ward: Xuân An, Xuân Bình, Xuân Hòa, Xuân Trung, Xuân Thanh, Phú Bình, Bảo Vinh, Suối Tre, Xuân Lập, Bàu Sen, Xuân Tân
Commune: Bảo Quang, Hàng Gòn, Bình Lộc, Bàu Trâm.

Sights
Saint Joseph Great Seminary of Xuân Lộc is the seventh major seminary of the Catholic Church in Vietnam
Cathedral of Christ the King (Cathedral of Long Khánh)
Monument of Victory
 Hang Gon dolmen tomb (Hàng Gòn, Long Khánh)

References

Districts of Đồng Nai province
Cities in Vietnam
Populated places in Đồng Nai province